DYSI (1323 AM) Super Radyo is a radio station owned and operated by GMA Network Inc. The station's studio is located inside the GMA Compound, Phase 5, Alta Tierra Village, Brgy. Quntin Salas, Jaro, Iloilo City, and its transmitter is located at Brgy. Jibao-an, Pavia, Iloilo.

The station formerly held the call letters DYXX (Double X), inspired from DZXX/DWXX in Manila, from its inception on September 1, 1985 to On April 13, 1997, when it changed to its current callsign and switched to a news and music format.

References

Super Radyo stations
Radio stations in Iloilo City
News and talk radio stations in the Philippines
Radio stations established in 1957